Cheese straws are a traditional food of England and the Southern United States. They are eaten as an appetizer or snack.  They are made as cut strips, or by using a cookie press, from dough made with butter, flour, salt, cheddar cheese and cayenne pepper. Variations use different types of cheese, spices and nuts.

References

Snack foods
Cuisine of the Southern United States